Ahmedabad Junction - Shri Chhatrapati Shahu Maharaj Terminus Kolhapur Express is an express train of the Indian Railways connecting Shri Chhatrapati Shahu Maharaj Terminus, Kolhapur in Maharashtra and  Ahmedabad Junction in Gujarat. It is currently being operated with 11049/11050 train numbers on a weekly basis.

Service

11049 Ahmedabad Junction - Shri Chhatrapati Shahu Maharaj Terminus Kolhapur Express covers 952 km in 20 hours and 11050 Shri Chhatrapati Shahu Maharaj Terminus Kolhapur - Ahmedabad Junction Express and covers 952 km in 19 hrs 25 mins.

Route and halts 

The important halts of the train are :

Traction

As the route is yet to be fully electrified, it is hauled by a Pune Diesel Loco Shed  based WDM-3A from Kolhapur up to Pune handing over to either Kalyan Electric Loco Shed based WAP7 locomotive or Vadodara Electric Loco Shed based WAP7 locomotive for the remainder of the journey until Ahmedabad.

At Karjat, both trains get two or three WAG-5, WAG-7 or WCAM-2 bankers of Kalyan Loco Shed to push the train on the ghat section between Karjat railway station and Lonavala railway station, where the gradient is of 1 in 40.

Rake Maintenance 

The train is maintained by the Kolhapur Coaching Depot. The same rake is used for Shri Chhatrapati Shahu Maharaj Terminus Kolhapur - Hazrat Nizamuddin Superfast Express for one way which is altered by the second rake on the other way.

See also 

 Shri Chhatrapati Shahu Maharaj Terminus railway station
 Ahmedabad Junction railway station
 Shri Chhatrapati Shahu Maharaj Terminus Kolhapur - Hazrat Nizamuddin Superfast Express

References 
11049/Ahmedabad - CSMT Kolhapur Express
11050/CSMT Kolhapur - Ahmedabad Express

Rail transport in Maharashtra
Rail transport in Gujarat
Transport in Ahmedabad
Express trains in India
Transport in Kolhapur